Erving's Location is a township in Coös County, New Hampshire, United States. As of the 2020 census, the population of the township was zero. In New Hampshire, locations, grants, townships (which are different from towns), and purchases are unincorporated portions of a county which are not part of any town and have limited self-government (if any, as many are uninhabited).

There is a dirt road that starts at New Hampshire State Route 26 in Millsfield just north of a pond and ends to the west in Erving's Location's northeast corner. It is the only way to get to Erving's Location without hiking.

History 
In 1775, a land grant was made to Captain William Erving of Boston, who had fought in the French and Indian Wars.

Geography
It is drained by Phillips Brook, which rises in the township and flows south to the Upper Ammonoosuc River in Stark, part of the Connecticut River watershed. The northeast corner of the township is drained by the West Branch of Clear Stream, flowing east to the Androscoggin River in Errol.

Demographics

In the 2020 census, no people were recorded as living in Erving's Location.

References

Townships in Coös County, New Hampshire
Berlin, New Hampshire micropolitan area
Townships in New Hampshire